In differential geometry, a Wente torus is an immersed torus in  of constant mean curvature, discovered by .  It is a counterexample to the conjecture of Heinz Hopf that every closed, compact, constant-mean-curvature surface is a sphere (though this is true if the surface is embedded).  There are similar examples known for every positive genus.

References

The Wente torus, University of Toledo Mathematics Department, retrieved 2013-09-01.

External links
Visualization of the Wente torus

Differential geometry of surfaces